Theobald is a small town located in the province of Santa Fe, Argentina. It is located within the Constitución Department near the border between the provinces of Santa Fe and Buenos Aires.

The town is home to 529 inhabitants as of 2010.

References

External links

Populated places in Santa Fe Province